Kirchenlied ("Church song") is a German Catholic hymnal published in 1938. It was a collection of 140 old and new songs, including hymns by Protestant authors. It was the seed for a common Catholic hymnal which was realised decades later, in the Gotteslob (1975).

History 

It was a collection of 140 songs from different periods, starting in the 16th century, and it included several Protestant songs as well as ten of Thurmair's own songs. Known as the "Standard Songbook", it was designed to be a common hymnal for German-speaking Catholics.

The hymnal, unlike other publications by Thurmair, was not immediately banned by the Nazis, because of its many Protestant songs. From the fourth edition, the subtitle was shortened to "Eine Auslese geistlicher Lieder" because it was generally accepted, not only by young people. It was published by the Christophorus-Verlag, then part of the Catholic Verlag Herder.

Kirchenlied was significant for ecumenical church singing in German and became the seed for the 1975 Gotteslob. 75 of its songs were included in the Gotteslob.

Layout 

The hymnal appeared in a text edition (Textausgabe) and an edition with musical scores (Notenausgabe). The exterior design was simple. The music books were partly in two colours, with the headers and staff red, text and notes black. Alfred Riedel was responsible for the layout with its large structuring headers for the sections, and a cover which showed a stylised view of the Altenberger Dom. The adjacent Haus Altenberg was from 1926 the centre of the Catholic youth movement. The hymnal had no illustrations and included some songs derived from Gregorian chant, rendered without rhythm and metre.

Topics 
The songs are grouped by themes, which are marked by section headers. Songs of general praise and petition are followed by songs for the occasions of the liturgical year, songs venerating Saints (Heiligenlieder), songs for the times of day, songs about death and dying, and hymns for the celebration of mass. All but the last header are the incipits of hymns.

 Großer Gott, wir loben dich (1–7) – Praise
 Unsere Zuflucht, Gott, du bist (8–20) – Petition
 Es kommt der Herr der Herrlichkeit (21–29) – Advent
 Es ist ein Ros entsprungen (30–44) – Christmas
 Mir nach! spricht Christus (45–48) – Following Jesus
 O du hochheilig Kreuze (49–58) – Passiontide
 Erschienen ist der herrliche Tag (59–68) – Easter
 O Jesu Christe wahres Licht (69–80) – Pentecost
 Kommt her, des Königs Aufgebot (81–85)
 Gegrüßet seist du, Maria (86–99) – Mary
 Ihr Freunde Gottes allzugleich (100–107) – Saints
 Der Tag ist aufgegangen (108–116) – Morning
 Mein Gott, wie schön ist deine Welt (117–120) – Daytime
 Mit meinem Gott geh ich zur Ruh (121–128) – Evening
 Wir sind nur Gast auf Erden (129–133) – Death
 Zur Opferfeier (134–140) – Mass

Songs of Protestant origin 
The collection includes 38 songs, sometimes shortened, which were written by Protestant authors, including "Lobe den Herren", "Macht hoch die Tür" and "Wie schön leuchtet der Morgenstern". 26 of them were here published in a Catholic hymnal for the first time. Three songs by Martin Luther were included in the hymnal ("Es kam ein Engel hell und klar", "Gelobet seist du, Jesu Christ" and "Gott sei gelobet und gebenedeiet"), but his name was not mentioned; instead, a temporal reference, "16th century", was used. While the inclusion of these songs met with criticism, Bishop or Mainz Albert Stohr, in his preface, congratulates the editors for their ecumenical effort: "Dank sei euch, daß ihr mit Liebe gesammelt habt, was uns an gemeinsamem Liedgut verbinden kann zu einem gewaltigen Gottbekenntnis aller Christen in deutschen Landen!" (Thanks be to you, for you collected with love a common wealth of songs which can unite us to a powerful profession of God by all Christians in German lands!)

Songs

Literature 
 Hartmann Bernberg: Singt dem Herrn ein neues Lied! Das deutsche Kirchenlied + Erbe und Aufgabe. Verlag Jugendhaus Düsseldorf, Düsseldorf

References 

Catholic Church in Germany
Catholic hymnals
1938 books